Rhapsody in Blue is a 1924 musical composition written by George Gershwin for solo piano and jazz band, which combines elements of classical music with jazz-influenced effects. Commissioned by bandleader Paul Whiteman, the work premiered in a concert titled "An Experiment in Modern Music" on February 12, 1924, in Aeolian Hall, New York City. Whiteman's band performed the rhapsody with Gershwin playing the piano. Whiteman's arranger Ferde Grofé orchestrated the rhapsody several times including the 1924 original scoring, the 1926 pit orchestra scoring, and the 1942 symphonic scoring.

The rhapsody is one of Gershwin's most recognizable creations and a key composition that defined the Jazz Age. Gershwin's piece inaugurated a new era in America's musical history, established Gershwin's reputation as an eminent composer, and eventually became one of the most popular of all concert works. In the American Heritage magazine, Frederic D. Schwarz posits that the famous opening clarinet glissando has become as instantly recognizable to concert audiences as the opening of Beethoven's Fifth Symphony.

History

Commission 

Following the success of an experimental classical-jazz concert held with Canadian singer Éva Gauthier in New York City on November 1, 1923, bandleader Paul Whiteman decided to attempt a more ambitious feat. He asked composer George Gershwin to write a concerto-like piece for an all-jazz concert in honor of Lincoln's Birthday to be given at Aeolian Hall. Whiteman became fixated upon performing such an extended composition by Gershwin after he collaborated with him in The Scandals of 1922. He had been especially impressed by Gershwin's one-act "jazz opera" Blue Monday. Gershwin initially declined Whiteman's request on the grounds that—as there would likely be a need for revisions to the score—he would have insufficient time to compose the work.

Soon after, on the evening of January 3, George Gershwin and lyricist Buddy DeSylva were playing billiards at the Ambassador Billiard Parlor at Broadway and 52nd Street in Manhattan. Their game was interrupted by Ira Gershwin, George's brother, who had been reading the January 4 edition of the New-York Tribune. An unsigned article entitled "What Is American Music?" about an upcoming Whiteman concert had caught Ira's attention. The article falsely declared that George Gershwin was already "at work on a jazz concerto" for Whiteman's concert.

Gershwin was puzzled by the news announcement as he had politely declined to compose any such work for Whiteman. In a telephone conversation with Whiteman the next morning, Gershwin was informed that Whiteman's arch rival Vincent Lopez was planning to steal the idea of his experimental concert and there was no time to lose. Gershwin was thus finally persuaded by Whiteman to compose the piece.

Composition 
With only five weeks remaining until the premiere, Gershwin hurriedly set about composing the work. He later claimed that, while on a train journey to Boston, the thematic seeds for Rhapsody in Blue began to germinate in his mind. He told biographer Isaac Goldberg in 1931:

Gershwin began composing on January 7 as dated on the original manuscript for two pianos. He tentatively entitled the piece as American Rhapsody during its composition. The revised title Rhapsody in Blue was suggested by Ira Gershwin after his visit to a gallery exhibition of James McNeill Whistler paintings, which had titles such as Nocturne in Black and Gold: The Falling Rocket and Arrangement in Grey and Black. After a few weeks, Gershwin finished his composition and passed the score, titled A Rhapsody in Blue, to Ferde Grofé, Whiteman's arranger. Grofé finished orchestrating the piece on February 4—a mere eight days before the premiere.

Premiere 

Rhapsody in Blue premiered during a snowy afternoon on Tuesday, February 12, 1924, at Aeolian Hall, Manhattan. Entitled "An Experiment in Modern Music," the much-anticipated concert held by Paul Whiteman and his Palais Royal Orchestra drew a "packed audience." The excited audience consisted of "vaudevillians, concert managers come to have a look at the novelty, Tin Pan Alleyites, composers, symphony and opera stars, flappers, cake-eaters, all mixed up higgledy-piggledy."  Many influential figures of the era were present, including Carl Van Vechten, Marguerite d'Alvarez, Victor Herbert, Walter Damrosch, Igor Stravinsky, Fritz Kreisler, Leopold Stokowski, John Philip Sousa, and Willie "the Lion" Smith.

In a pre-concert lecture, Whiteman's manager Hugh C. Ernst proclaimed the purpose of the concert was "to be purely educational". The selected music was intended to exemplify the "melodies, harmony and rhythms which agitate the throbbing emotional resources of this young restless age." The concert's program was lengthy with 26 separate musical movements, divided into 2 parts and 11 sections, bearing titles such as "True Form Of Jazz" and "Contrast—Legitimate Scoring vs. Jazzing." In the program's schedule, Gershwin's rhapsody was merely the penultimate piece and preceded Elgar's Pomp and Circumstance March No. 1.

Many of the early numbers in the program reportedly underwhelmed the audience, and the ventilation system in the concert hall malfunctioned. Some audience members were departing for the exits by the time Gershwin made his inconspicuous entrance for the rhapsody. The audience purportedly were irritable, impatient, and restless until the haunting clarinet glissando that opened Rhapsody in Blue was heard. The distinctive glissando had been created quite by happenstance during rehearsals: 

The rhapsody was then performed by Whiteman's orchestra consisting of "twenty-three musicians in the ensemble" with George Gershwin on piano. In characteristic style, Gershwin chose to partially improvise his piano solo. The orchestra anxiously waited for Gershwin's nod which signaled the end of his piano solo and the cue for the ensemble to resume playing. As Gershwin improvised some of what he was playing, the solo piano section was not technically written until after the performance, and it remains unknown exactly how the original rhapsody sounded at the premiere.

Audience reaction and success 

Upon the conclusion of the rhapsody, there was "tumultuous applause for Gershwin's composition," and, quite unexpectedly, "the concert, in every respect but the financial, was a 'knockout'." The concert quickly became historically significant due to the premiere of the rhapsody, and its program would "become not only a historic document, finding its way into foreign monographs on jazz, but a rarity as well."

Following the success of rhapsody's premiere, future performances followed. The first British performance of Rhapsody in Blue took place at the Savoy Hotel in London on June 15, 1925. It was broadcast in a live relay by the BBC. Debroy Somers conducted the Savoy Orpheans with Gershwin himself at the piano. The piece was heard again in the United Kingdom during the second European tour of the Paul Whiteman Orchestra, most notably on April 11, 1926, at the Royal Albert Hall, with Gershwin in the audience. The Royal Albert Hall concert was recorded—though not issued—by the Gramophone Company/HMV.

By the end of 1927, Whiteman's band had performed Rhapsody in Blue approximately 84 times, and its recording sold a million copies. For the entire piece to fit onto two sides of a 12-inch record, the rhapsody had to be played at a faster speed than usual in a concert, which gave it a hurried feel and some rubato was lost. Whiteman later adopted the piece as his band's theme song and opened his radio programs with the slogan "Everything new but the Rhapsody in Blue."

Critical response

Contemporary reviews 

In contrast to the warm reception by concert audiences, professional music critics in the press gave the rhapsody decidedly mixed reviews. Pitts Sanborn declared that the rhapsody "begins with a promising theme well stated" yet "soon runs off into empty passage-work and meaningless repetition." A number of reviews were particularly negative. One opinionated music critic, Lawrence Gilman—a Richard Wagner enthusiast who would later write a devastating review of Gershwin's Porgy and Bess—harshly criticized the rhapsody as "derivative," "stale," and "inexpressive" in New-York Tribune review on February 13, 1924.

Other reviewers were more positive. Samuel Chotzinoff, music critic of the New York World, conceded that Gershwin's composition had "made an honest woman out of jazz," while Henrietta Strauss of The Nation opined that Gershwin had "added a new chapter to our musical history." Olin Downes, reviewing the concert in The New York Times, wrote:

Overall, a recurrent criticism leveled by professional music critics was that Gershwin's piece was essentially formless and that he had haphazardly glued melodic segments together.

Retrospective reviews 
Years after its premiere, Rhapsody in Blue continued to divide music critics principally due to its perceived melodic incoherence. Constant Lambert, a British composer whose work was also influenced by jazz, was openly dismissive towards the work:

In an article in The Atlantic Monthly in 1955, Leonard Bernstein, who nevertheless admitted that he adored the piece, stated:

Orchestration 

As Gershwin did not have sufficient knowledge of orchestration in 1924, Ferde Grofé—Whiteman's pianist and chief arranger—was a key figure in enabling the rhapsody's meteoric success, and critics have contended that Grofé's arrangements of the Rhapsody secured its place in American culture. Gershwin's biographer, Isaac Goldberg, noted in 1931 that Grofé played a crucial role in the premiere's triumph:

Grofé's familiarity with the Whiteman band's strengths was a key factor in his 1924 scoring. This orchestration was developed for solo piano and Whiteman's twenty-three musicians. For the reeds section, Ross Gorman (Reed I) played an oboe, a heckelphone, a clarinet in B, sopranino saxophones in E & B, an alto saxophone, one E soprano clarinet, and alto and bass clarinets; Donald Clark (Reed II) played a soprano saxophone in B, alto and baritone saxophones, and Hale Byers (Reed III) played soprano saxophone in B, tenor saxophone, baritone saxophone, and a flute.

For the brass section, two trumpets in B were played by Henry Busse and Frank Siegrist; two French horns in F were played by Arturo Cerino and Al Corrado; two trombones were played by Roy Maxon and James Casseday, and a tuba and a double bass played by Guss Helleburg and Albert Armer respectively.

The percussion section included a drum set, timpani, and a glockenspiel played by George Marsh; one piano typically played by either Ferde Grofé or Henry Lange; one tenor banjo played by Michael Pingatore, and a complement of violins.

This original arrangement—with its unique instrumental requirements—was largely ignored until its revival in reconstructions beginning in the mid-1980s, owing to the popularity and serviceability of the later scorings. After the 1924 premiere, Grofé revised the score and made new orchestrations in 1926 and 1942, each time for larger orchestras. His arrangement for a theater orchestra was published in 1926. This adaptation was orchestrated for a more standard "pit orchestra," which included one flute, one oboe, two clarinets, one bassoon, three saxophones; two French horns, two trumpets, and two trombones; as well as the same percussion and strings complement as the later 1942 version.

The later 1942 arrangement by Grofé was for a full symphony orchestra. It is scored for solo piano and an orchestra consisting of two flutes, two oboes, two clarinets in B and A, one bass clarinet, two bassoons, two alto saxophones in E, one tenor saxophone in B; three French horns in F, three trumpets in B, three trombones, one tuba; a percussion section that includes timpani, one suspended cymbal, one snare drum, one bass drum, one tam-tam, one triangle, one glockenspiel, and cymbals; one tenor banjo; and strings. Since the mid-20th century, this 1942 version was the arrangement usually performed by classical orchestras and became a staple of the concert repertoire until 1976 when Michael Tilson Thomas recorded the original jazz band version for the first time, employing Gershwin's actual 1925 piano roll with a full jazz orchestra.

Grofé's other arrangements of Gershwin's piece include those done for Whiteman's 1930 film, King of Jazz, and the concert band setting (playable without piano) completed by 1938 and published 1942. The prominence of the saxophones in the later orchestrations is somewhat reduced, and the banjo part can be dispensed with, as its mainly rhythmic contribution is provided by the inner strings.

Gershwin himself made versions of the piece for solo piano as well as two pianos. The solo version is notable for omitting several sections of the piece. Gershwin's intent to eventually do an orchestration of his own is documented in 1936–37 correspondence from the publisher Harms.

Notable recordings 

After the warm reception of Rhapsody in Blue by the audience at Aeolian Hall, Gershwin recorded several abridged versions of his composition in different formats. On June 10, 1924, Gershwin and Whiteman's orchestra created an acoustic recording running 8 minutes and 59 seconds and produced by the Victor Talking Machine Company. A year later, Gershwin recorded his performance on a 1925 piano roll for a two-piano version. Later, on April 21, 1927, he made an electrical recording with Whiteman's orchestra running 9 minutes and 1 second and again produced by Victor. Nathaniel Shilkret purportedly conducted the electrical recording after a dispute between Gershwin and Whiteman. Whiteman's orchestra later performed a truncated version of the piece in the 1930 film The King of Jazz with Roy Bargy on piano. 

Due to the length limitations of early recording formats, it was not until the Great Depression that the first complete and unabridged recording of Gershwin's composition could be undertaken. In July 1935, after several years of performing the rhapsody for sold-out audiences in Massachusetts, conductor Arthur Fiedler and the Boston Pops Orchestra recorded the first unabridged version—nearly fourteen minutes in length—with Puerto Rican pianist Jesús María Sanromá for RCA Victor. For this first unabridged recording, Fiedler discarded Ferde Grofé's original 1924 arrangement and adapted the piece for a conventional symphony. At the time, contemporary critics praised Fiedler for jettisoning the so-called "jazzy sentimentality" of Grofé's earlier arrangement and adding a "more symphonic richness and authority."

During the final months of World War II, amid the box-office success of the Gershwin biographical film Rhapsody in Blue (1945), pianist Oscar Levant recorded the now iconic composition with Eugene Ormandy's Philadelphia Orchestra on August 21, 1945. Levant had been an intimate friend of the deceased composer, and he sought to replicate Gershwin's idiomatic playing style in his performance. Levant's homage—labelled Columbia Masterworks 251—received rapturous reviews and became one of the best-selling record albums of the year. As a result of Levant's recording and the 1945 biographical film about Gershwin's life, a "Gershwin revival" ensued.

By the 1960s and 1970s, Gershwin's rhapsody had become a predictable staple of both concert performances and orchestra recordings; consequently, more diverse and irreverent interpretations appeared over time. In Summer 1973, Brazilian jazz-rock artist Eumir Deodato reinterpreted Gershwin's rhapsody in an abridged version that featured uptempo neo‐samba rhythms. Although music critics derided Deodato's interpretation as "mangled" and barely recognizable, his single reached No. 41 on the "Hot 100" and No. 10 on "Easy Listening" on the Billboard charts, and No. 48 and No. 13 respectively in Canada. In the wake of Deodato's earlier reinterpretation, French pianist Richard Clayderman recorded a similarly abridged disco arrangement in 1978 which became one of his signature pieces.

Concurrent with the emergence of these more diverse interpretations, scholarly interest revived in the original 1924 arrangement by Ferde Grofé which had not been performed since the end of the Jazz Age. On February 14, 1973, conductor Kenneth Kiesler and pianist Paul Verrette performed Grofé's original arrangement on the University of New Hampshire campus. Soon after, conductor Michael Tilson Thomas and the Columbia Jazz Band recorded Grofé's arrangement in 1976, as did conductor Maurice Peress with pianist Ivan Davis in 1984 as part of a 60th-anniversary reconstruction of the entire 1924 concert.

Nearly a hundred years after the debut of Gershwin's rhapsody in 1924, tens of thousands of orchestras as well as solo pianists have recorded the piece, both abridged and unabridged. A number of these recordings have garnered critical recognition such as pianist Michel Camilo's 2006 rendition which won a Latin Grammy Award.

Form and analysis 

As a jazz concerto, Rhapsody in Blue is written for solo piano with orchestra. A rhapsody differs from a concerto in that it features one extended movement instead of separate movements. Rhapsodies often incorporate passages of an improvisational nature—although written out in a score—and are irregular in form, with heightened contrasts and emotional exuberance. The music ranges from intensely rhythmic piano solos to slow, broad, and richly orchestrated sections. Consequently, the Rhapsody "may be looked upon as a fantasia, with no strict fidelity to form."

The opening of Rhapsody in Blue is written as a clarinet trill followed by a legato, 17 notes in a diatonic scale. During a rehearsal, Whiteman's virtuoso clarinetist, Ross Gorman, rendered the upper portion of the scale as a captivating and trombone-like glissando. Gershwin heard it and insisted that it be repeated in the performance. The effect is produced using the tongue and throat muscles to change the resonance of the oral cavity, thus controlling the continuously rising pitch. Many clarinet players gradually open the left-hand tone holes on their instrument during the passage from the last concert F to the top concert B as well. This effect has now become standard performance practice for the work.

Rhapsody in Blue features both rhythmic invention and melodic inspiration, and demonstrates Gershwin's ability to write a piece with large-scale harmonic and melodic structure. The piece is characterized by strong motivic inter-relatedness. Much of the motivic material is introduced in the first 14 measures. Musicologist David Schiff has identified five major themes plus a sixth "tag". Two themes appear in the first 14 measures, and the tag shows up in measure 19. Two of the remaining three themes are rhythmically related to the very first theme in measure 2, which is sometimes called the "Glissando theme"—after the opening glissando in the clarinet solo—or the "Ritornello theme". The remaining theme is the "Train theme", which is the first to appear at rehearsal 9 after the opening material. All of these themes rely on the blues scale, which includes lowered sevenths and a mixture of major and minor thirds. Each theme appears both in orchestrated form and as a piano solo. There are considerable differences in the style of presentation of each theme.

The harmonic structure of the rhapsody is more difficult to analyze. The piece begins and ends in B major, but it modulates towards the sub-dominant direction very early on, returning to B major at the end, rather abruptly. The opening modulates "downward", as it were, through the keys B, E, A, D, G, B, E, and finally to A major. Modulation through the circle of fifths in the reverse direction inverts classical tonal relationships, but does not abandon them. The entire middle section resides primarily in C major, with forays into G major (the dominant relation). Such modulations occur freely, although not always with harmonic direction. Gershwin frequently uses a recursive harmonic progression of minor thirds to give the illusion of motion when in fact a passage does not change key from beginning to end. Modulation by thirds is a common feature of Tin Pan Alley music.

The influences of jazz and other contemporary styles are present in Rhapsody in Blue. Ragtime rhythms are abundant, as is the Cuban "clave" rhythm, which doubles as a dance rhythm in the Charleston jazz dance. Gershwin's own intentions were to correct the belief that jazz had to be played strictly in time so that one could dance to it. The rhapsody's tempos vary widely, and there is an almost extreme use of rubato in many places throughout. The clearest influence of jazz is the use of blue notes, and the exploration of their half-step relationship plays a key role in the rhapsody. The use of so-called "vernacular" instruments, such as accordion, banjo, and saxophones in the orchestra, contribute to its jazz or popular style, and the latter two of these instruments have remained part of Grofé's "standard" orchestra scoring.

Gershwin incorporated several different piano styles into his work. He used the techniques of stride piano, novelty piano, comic piano, and the song-plugger piano style. Stride piano's rhythmic and improvisational style is evident in the "agitato e misterioso" section, which begins four bars after rehearsal 33, as well as in other sections, many of which include the orchestra. Novelty piano can be heard at rehearsal 9 with the revelation of the Train theme. The hesitations and light-hearted style of comic piano, a vaudeville approach to piano made well known by Chico Marx and Jimmy Durante, are evident at rehearsal 22.

Legacy and influence

Cultural zeitgeist 

According to critic Orrin Howard of the Los Angeles Philharmonic, Gershwin's rhapsody "made an indelible mark on the history of American music, on the fraternity of serious composers and performers—many of whom were present at the premiere—and on Gershwin himself, for its enthusiastic reception encouraged him to other and more serious projects."

Howard posits that the work's legacy is best understood as embodying the cultural zeitgeist of the Jazz Age:  Although Gershwin's rhapsody "was by no means a definitive example of jazz in the Jazz Age," music historians such as James Ciment and Floyd Levin have similarly concurred that it is the key composition that encapsulates the spirit of the era.

As early as 1927, writer F. Scott Fitzgerald opined that Rhapsody in Blue idealized the youthful zeitgeist of the Jazz Age. In subsequent decades, both the latter era and Fitzgerald's related literary works have been often culturally linked by critics and scholars with Gershwin's composition. In 1941, social historian Peter Quennell opined that Fitzgerald's novel The Great Gatsby embodied "the sadness and the remote jauntiness of a Gershwin tune." Accordingly, Rhapsody in Blue was used as a dramatic leitmotif for the character of Jay Gatsby in the 2013 film The Great Gatsby, a cinematic adaptation of Fitzgerald's 1925 novel.

Various writers, such as the American playwright and journalist Terry Teachout, have likened Gershwin himself to the character of Gatsby due to his attempt to transcend his lower-class background, his abrupt meteoric success, and his early death while in his thirties.

Musical portrait of New York City 

Rhapsody in Blue has been interpreted as a musical portrait of early-20th-century New York City. Culture scribe Darryn King wrote in The Wall Street Journal that "Gershwin's fusion of jazz and classical traditions captures the thriving melting pot of Jazz Age New York."

Likewise, music historian Vince Giordano has opined that "the syncopation, the blue notes, the ragtime and jazz rhythms that Gershwin wrote in 1924 was really a feeling of New York City in that amazing era. The rhythm of the city seems to be in there." Pianist Lang Lang echoes this sentiment: "When I hear Rhapsody in Blue, I see the Empire State Building somehow. I see the New York Skyline in midtown Manhattan, and I already see the coffee shops [in] Times Square."

Accordingly, the opening montage of Woody Allen's 1979 film Manhattan features a rendition by Zubin Mehta in which quintessential New York scenes are set to the music of Gershwin's famed jazz concerto. Twenty years later, Walt Disney Pictures used the composition for the New York segment of the 1999 animated film Fantasia 2000, in which the piece lyrically frames an animated segment drawn in the style of illustrator Al Hirschfeld.

Influence on composers 
Gershwin's rhapsody has influenced a number of composers. In 1955, Rhapsody in Blue served as the inspiration for a composition by accordionist and composer John Serry Sr. which was subsequently published in 1957 as American Rhapsody. Brian Wilson, leader of The Beach Boys, stated on several occasions that Rhapsody in Blue is one of his favorite pieces. He first heard the piece when he was two years old and recalled that he adored it. According to biographer Peter Ames Carlin, it was an influence on his Smile album. Rhapsody in Blue also inspired a collaboration between blind savant British pianist Derek Paravicini and composer Matthew King on a new concerto, called Blue premiered at the South Bank Centre in London in 2011.

Sampling 
Rhapsody in Blue is being sampled in South Korean girl group Red Velvet's "Birthday".

Other use 
Rhapsody in Blue was played simultaneously by 84 pianists at the opening ceremony of the 1984 Summer Olympics in Los Angeles. Pianists Herbie Hancock and Lang Lang performed Rhapsody in Blue at the 50th Grammy Awards on February 10, 2008. Since 1980, the piece has been used by United Airlines in their advertisements, in pre-flight safety videos, and in the Terminal 1 underground walkway at Chicago O'Hare International Airport.

Preservation status 
On September 22, 2013, it was announced that a musicological critical edition of the full orchestral score will be eventually released. The Gershwin family, working in conjunction with the Library of Congress and the University of Michigan, are working to make these scores available to the public. Though the entire Gershwin project may take 40 years to complete, the Rhapsody in Blue edition will be an early volume.

Rhapsody in Blue entered the public domain on January 1, 2020, although individual recordings of it may remain under copyright.

References

Notes

Citations

Works cited

Print sources

Online sources

External links 

 
 
 Gershwin's Original Manuscript for Rhapsody in Blue at the Library of Congress

1924 compositions
Articles containing video clips
Compositions by George Gershwin
Compositions for piano and orchestra
Concert band pieces
Grammy Hall of Fame Award recipients
Jazz compositions
Music of New York City
Rhapsodies
United Airlines
United States National Recording Registry recordings